Tatjana Kozlova-Johannes (born 8 January 1977 in Narva) is an Estonian-Russian composer.

In 2000s, she graduated from Estonian Academy of Music and Theatre in composition speciality.

As of about 2020, she is teaching the composition at Georg Ots Tallinn Music School.

In 2015, she received Annual Prize of the Endowment for Music of the Cultural Endowment of Estonia.

Since 2004, she is a member of Estonian Composers' Union.

She received in 2022 the Lepo Sumera Composition Prize.

Works

works for orchestra
 "Lighting the Fire" ('Tule süütamine') (2015)
 "The Shadow of the Scream" ('Karje vari') (2004)
 "Creation" ('Loomine') (2017)

Chamber music 
To sing a song before the night comes (2020) flute, bass clarinet, piano 15min

Premiere at Estonian Music Days & Baltic Music Days 2021, Taavi Kerikmäe, Tarmo Johannes, Fie Schouten

References

Living people
1977 births
Estonian composers